The 2003 Enugu State gubernatorial election occurred in Nigeria on April 19, 2003. The PDP nominee Chimaroke Nnamani won the election, defeating Onu Solomon of the NRP.

Chimaroke Nnamani emerged PDP candidate. He picked Okechukwu Ezewata Itanyi as his running mate. Onu Solomon was the NRP candidate with Walter Obiorah Oji as his running mate.

Electoral system
The Governor of Enugu State is elected using the plurality voting system.

Primary election

PDP primary
The PDP primary election was won by Chimaroke Nnamani. He picked Okechukwu Ezewata Itanyi as his running mate.

NRP primary
The NRP primary election was won by Onu Solomon. He picked Walter Obiorah Oji as his running mate.

Results
A total number of 13 candidates registered with the Independent National Electoral Commission to contest in the election.

The total number of registered voters in the state was 1,479,542. Total number of votes cast was 1,215,809, while number of valid votes was 1,207,114. Rejected votes were 8,695.

References 

Enugu State gubernatorial elections
Enugu State gubernatorial election
Enugu State gubernatorial election
Enugu State gubernatorial election